Rhymes Through Times is an Emmy-nominated American animated musical series created by Lasette Canady, featuring music performed by Christopher Jackson, and animation by Lion Forge. The series first premiered on the Noggin app and on the Nick Jr. Youtube channel. Music from the series was released as an album across music streaming platforms.

The series debuted on February 15, 2021, and is currently in its first season with 7 episodes already released. Each episode of Rhymes Through Times celebrates Black culture by highlighting the stories and experiences of Black historical figures. Set as a stage play, beloved Nick Jr. characters (Bubble Guppies, Blaze and the Monster Machines, Nella the Princess Knight, and Butterbean's Café) dress up to portray iconic figures such as Amanda Gorman, Ruby Bridges, Thurgood Marshall, Katherine Johnson, Alvin Ailey, Aretha Franklin, and more.

Reception 
The 7-episode social good series was reviewed by Dr. Beverly Tatum, an advisor in anti-bias education. It was given 4 out of 5 stars by Common Sense Media. And In 2021 Rhymes Through Times received a Cynopsis Model D award for Best New Web Series. In 2022 it was nominated for a Kidscreen Award for Best Web/App Series. And on November 1, 2022 it was announced that Rhymes Through Times was nominated for an Emmy award for outstanding short-form program, in the first-ever Children's and Family Emmys.

Songs and episodes

Accolades

References

External links 
 Rhymes through Times at IMDB

Animated musical films